Denis James Meaney (1 October 1936 – 25 July 2011) was a professional Australian rugby league footballer who played in the 1950s and 1960s.

Born at Manly, New South Wales in 1936, Meaney began his first grade rugby league career at Manly in 1957. He played three seasons for Manly-Warringah Sea Eagles between 1957–1959, playing alongside internationals such as Roy Bull and Rex Mossop. He then played seven seasons for the Western Suburbs Magpies including 135 first grade games between 1960–1966, often playing alongside legendary forwards such as Noel Kelly, Kel O'Shea, Jack Gibson and Jim Cody . He played prop-forward for his whole career and will be remembered as one of the toughest forwards of his era. He played in three losing grand finals: 1957, 1962 and 1963.

He represented New South Wales rugby league team Colts in 1958 against Great Britain but was not selected on the Kangaroo Tour. He also played for N.S.W. City Firsts in 1961. His long NSWRFL career came to a close in 1967, although he later went on to become a Country NSWRL selector for 17 years and a successful rugby league coach at Lismore Marist Brothers.

He retired to Ballina, New South Wales until his death in 2011, age 74.
The Ballina Seagulls play Lismore Marist Brothers annually for the Denis Meaney Shield, which was named in his honour in 2010.

He is the grandfather of current Melbourne Storm player Nick Meaney.

References

1936 births
2011 deaths
Manly Warringah Sea Eagles players
Western Suburbs Magpies players
Australian rugby league administrators
Australian rugby league coaches
Australian rugby league players
Rugby league players from Sydney